Snap Send Solve is a smart cities technology platform that simplifies the reporting of community issues in Australia and New Zealand.

Snap Send Solve is a privately owned Australia technology company headquartered in Melbourne.

History 
Snap Send Solve was created in 2010 as an entry for the App My State by Outware Mobile (now known as Arq Group) as part of a Victorian Government open-data hackathon. The idea for the app was inspired by the founder, Danny Gorog who was frustrated by how hard it was to report a broken swing in a park. The app won a 2013 Melbourne Design Award.

Originally, the free platform only allowed for reporting to every council in Australia however after a request from South East Water, the platform was expanded to include other authorities who have assets in the public domain such as water authorities, telecommunication and power authorities. Since then other authorities and organisations have been added to the platform such as universities, other Government departments such as Agriculture Victoria, Wildlife Victoria and housing communities.

In 2015, Snap Send Solve was featured in an article in Government News by Maris Sansom titled 'Apps change the face of government' that outlines how apps such as Snap Send Solve are helping Councils save money by moving to more efficient channels. There are many other digital platforms that councils are adopting to help manage this transition.

In 2016 Snap Send Solve entered a commercial agreement with Christchurch City Council in New Zealand. Christchurch City Council entered the app into the ALGIM Web and Digital Symposium where it won the 'Best Use of Social Media/App'. Since 2016 it has been adopted by other councils and authorities in New Zealand including Waimakariri District Council, Selwyn District Council, Ashburton District Council and Canterbury Regional Council.

Community usage 
Usage of Snap Send Solve by the community has grown over time. In 2018, it was reported that councils in New South Wales received 14,758 reports for parking issues.  In January 2020 it was reported that Victorians had made 104,164 reports using Snap Send Solve, with the most popular incident categories being rubbish, graffiti and parking.

Snap Send Solve is featured and recommended as an official contact method of many councils and other authorities around Australia and New Zealand including:

 Whitehorse City Council
 Monash City Council
 Sutherland Shire Council
 City of Kalgoorlie Boulder
 University of Melbourne
 Bundaberg Regional Council
 Fraser Coast Regional Council
 Noosa Shire Council
 Rockhampton Regional Council
 Christchurch City Council
 Telstra
 Sydney Water
 Brisbane Council
Yarra Valley Water
Manningham Council

The apps use of geo-location means it can also be used for other novel purposes such as reporting of injured Australian wildlife to Wildlife Victoria and potential infestations of phylloxera to Agriculture Victoria.

Commercial model 
Snap Send Solve provides a free service to all Councils in Australia and New Zealand who can receive reports from the public that include images, geolocation details and reporter details. The company has been working with the MAV to create a paid Enterprise service that provides access to a reporting API and additional report customisation options.

Software as a service 
Snap Send Solve is a software as a service (SaaS) business and charges an annual license fee for the paid, Enterprise service.

References 

2010 establishments in Australia
Internet technology companies of Australia
Science and technology in New Zealand
Software companies of Australia
Smart cities